Surabuddin Mollick (born 4 May 1992) is an Indian footballer who plays as a midfielder for NorthEast United in Indian Super League.

Career

Early career
Mollick started his career with George Telegraph in the Calcutta Premier Division in 2008 before joining Mohammedan in 2009 and Mohun Bagan in 2010.

ONGC
Mollick then joined ONGC F.C. of the I-League in 2012, and made his debut for the club on 21 September 2012 against Kalighat MS in the 2012 Indian Federation Cup in which ONGC won 5–1. He then scored his first goal for the club on 16 November 2012 against reigning I-League champions Dempo S.C. at the Ambedkar Stadium in Delhi in the 12th minute as ONGC went on to win surprisingly 3–1 over the champions.

Bhawanipore
After ONGC were relegated from the I-League, Mollick returned to Kolkata to sign with Bhawanipore.

I-League statistics

References

Indian footballers
1992 births
Living people
Footballers from West Bengal
I-League players
I-League 2nd Division players
Calcutta Football League players
Mohammedan SC (Kolkata) players
Mohun Bagan AC players
ONGC FC players
Bhawanipore FC players
Association football midfielders